Saint-Norbert is a settlement in New Brunswick, Canada.

History

Saint-Norbert is a community in Weldford Parish, New Brunswick, located 2.25 km SE of Normandie. There was a Post Office 1881-1970 and it was established about 1850 as Louisbourg: formerly called Boucher Settlement for Eusèbe Boucher, Joseph Boucher and Antoine Boucher, who were early settlers in the area and in 1898 Saint-Norbert was a farming and lumbering settlement with 1 post office, 2 stores, 1 church and a population of 200.

Notable people

See also
List of communities in New Brunswick

References

Settlements in New Brunswick
Communities in Kent County, New Brunswick